North Devon College was a further education college in Barnstaple, North Devon. It is now part of Petroc.

History
North Devon College (NDC) first opened in 1952.

Originally, the plan was to spend £300,000 on the new North Devon Technical College, built on top of Sticklepath Hill. However, the college was developed in stages, starting with the engineering blocks (now B and C blocks).

In 1952, the college offered courses including carpentry, bricklaying, auto engineering, science and technical drawing.

Over the years, the college expanded and additional buildings were added. The campus reflects changes in architectural styles over the late 20th and early 21st centuries. The most recent new teaching building was J Block, completed in July 2002.

In 1969, NDC became one of the country’s first Tertiary Colleges, providing a Sixth Form for North Devon’s newly formed comprehensive schools.

As well as catering for the area’s teenagers, the college’s curriculum also encompassed adult learning, work-based training and Higher Education. The college held graduation celebrations in Barnstaple.

As NDC expanded, the college outgrew its main campus and leased additional premises in and around Barnstaple, including The Hair Academy at Roundswell and Queens House in the town centre. Further growth came through the addition of Bude and Holsworthy Training Services (BHTS), adding offices in the North Cornwall town and a stake in the Holsworthy Skills Centre.

Between 2006 and 2009, the college developed plans for a new, £125 million campus on the banks of the River Taw, at Seven Brethren in Barnstaple. The Learning and Skills Council committed £78 million to the project as part of the £2.3 billion Building Colleges for the Future programme. However, the LSC’s over-enthusiastic commitment of funds meant the programme overspent. As a result, plans to move the college to a new home were shelved indefinitely.

Despite this setback, NDC continued to develop facilities, including the creation of a new campus in the former Brannam Pottery buildings in Roundswell, Barnstaple.

NDC was frequently one of the top performing colleges in the country and was recognised as ‘outstanding’ by the Office for Standards in Education (Ofsted) at its last inspection in 2006.

Merger with East Devon College
On 1 August 2008 it was announced that North Devon College and East Devon College would merge. David Dodd, principal of North Devon College, was announced as principal of the new merged college. North Devon College was the nominal survivor of the merger, however that name was deemed unsuitable for the merged college due to its expanded catchment area.

Rebranding
On 23 September 2009 North Devon College was rebranded as Petroc.

Acorn FM
Acorn FM (now Fresh FM) was North Devon College's campus radio station. It was the first ever college station to have a 'Long term Restricted Service Licence'. Its broadcast on 87.7 FM by college students across the college campus.

Notable alumni
Katie Hopkins media personality (The Apprentice)
Stuart Brennan BAFTA winning actor

References

Barnstaple
Learning and Skills Beacons